Til Barsip or Til Barsib (Hittite Masuwari, modern Tell Ahmar) is an ancient site situated in Aleppo Governorate, Syria by the Euphrates river about 20 kilometers south of ancient Carchemish.

History
The site was inhabited as early as the Neolithic period, but it is the remains of the Iron Age city which is the most important settlement at Tell Ahmar. It was known in Hittite as Masuwari. The city remained largely Neo-Hittite up to its conquest by the Neo-Assyrian Empire in the 856 BC and the Luwian language was used even after that. Til Barsip was the capital of the Aramean-speaking Syro-Hittite state of Bît Adini. After being captured  by the Assyrians from its previous king Ahuni, the city was then renamed as Kar-Šulmānu-ašarēdu, after the Assyrian king Shalmaneser III, though its original name continued in use. It became a prominent center for the Assyrian administration of the region due to its strategic location at a crossing of the Euphrates river.

Til Barsip and Carchemish 
After Til Barsip was occupied by Shalmaneser III, the important nearby city of Karkamish (Carchemish), only 20 km upstream the Euphrates river, remained under the rule of local kings of the House of Suhi. The Assyrian sources appear mostly silent about Karkamish until the mid-8th century BC. The only exception was a brief mention by Samši-Adad V (824–811 BC). The Assyrians may have left Karkamish alone either because of its strength, or because they profited from the extensive trade that the city conducted with many locations. 

Probably around 848 BC, the change of dynasty at Carchemish took place, and the House of Astiruwa started to rule. Carchemish was finally conquered by Sargon II in 717 BC.

Archaeology

The tell was first examined by David George Hogarth, who proposed the identification as Til Barsip. 
The site was visited in 1909 by Gertrude Lowthian Bell who also took squeezes from some of the inscriptions there.
The site of Tell Ahmar was  excavated by the French archaeologist François Thureau-Dangin from 1929 to 1931.
He uncovered the Iron Age city and an Early Bronze Age hypogeum burial with a large amount of pottery. Three important steles were also discovered at the site. These record how the 8th century BC Aramean king Bar Ga'yah, who may be identical with the Assyrian governor Shamshi-ilu, made a treaty with the city of Arpad. Recent excavations at Tell Ahmar were conducted by Guy Bunnens from the University of Melbourne in the late 1980s and through to the present. Excavations ended in 2010.
Many ivory carvings of outstanding quality were discovered and these were published in 1997. Current excavations are under the auspices of the University of Liège, Belgium.

Ahmar/Qubbah stele (Tell Ahmar 6)
Among the early Iron Age monuments discovered in the area was a particularly well-preserved stele known as the Ahmar/Qubbah stele, inscribed in Luwian, which commemorates a military campaign by king :de:Hamiyata of Masuwari around 900 BC. The stele also attests to the continued cult of the deity 'Tarhunzas of the Army', whom Hamiyatas is thought to have linked with Tarhunzas of Heaven and with the Storm-God of Aleppo.
This stele also indicates that the first king of Masuwari was named Hapatila, which may represent an old Hurrian name Hepa-tilla.

According to Woudhuizen, the name Hamiatas could also be understood as a Luwian reflection of Semitic Ammi-Ad(d)a (‘Hadad is my paternal uncle'), and Hapatilas as Abd-Ila ('servant of El').

Hamiatas also set up some other Luwian hieroglyphic inscriptions. These are known as Tell Ahmar 2, 4 and 5, and Borowski 3. Hamiatas is also mentioned in an inscription Tell Ahmar 1 by one of his successors referred to as "Ariahinas’ son", as well as in the inscription Aleppo 2 by a confederate named Arpas.

Kings of Masuwari

 Hapatilla
 Hamiyatas 
 Bar Ga'yah
 Shamshi-ilu (governor)

See also

Cities of the ancient Near East
Short chronology timeline
Euphrates Syrian Pillar Figurines
Euphrates Handmade Syrian Horses and Riders

Notes

References
 Guy Bunnens, "Carved ivories from Til Barsib", American Journal of Archaeology, vol. 101, no.3, pp. 435–450, (July 1997). Online version by JSTOR 
 Arlette Roobaert, "A Neo-Assyrian Statue from Til Barsib", Iraq, vol. 58, pp. 79–87, 1996
 Stephanie Dalley, "Neo-Assyrian Tablets from Til Barsib", Abr-Nahrain, vol. 34, pp. 66–99, 1996–1997
 Pierre Bordreuil and Françoise Briquel-Chatonnet, "Aramaic Documents from Til Barsip", Abr-Nahrain, vol. 34, pp. 100–107, 1996–1997
 R. Campbell Thompson, "Til-Barsip and Its Cuneiform Inscriptions", PSBA, vol. 34, pp. 66–74, 1912.
 Arlette Roobaert, "The Middle Bronze Age Funerary Evidence from Tell Ahmar (Syria)", Ancient Near Eastern Studies, vol. 35, pp. 97–105, 1998
 Max E.L. Mallowan, "The Syrian City of Til-Barsib", Antiquity, vol. 11, pp. 328–39, 1937

External links

Geophysical Survey of Til Barsip - Archaeo-Physics 
Painting from Til Barsip at the Louvre

Bronze Age sites in Syria
Aramean cities
Syro-Hittite states
Ancient Assyrian cities
Former populated places in Syria
Neolithic sites in Syria
Iron Age sites in Syria
Archaeological sites in Aleppo Governorate